Richard Ferguson may refer to:
Richard Ferguson (highwayman) (died 1800), English highwayman
Richard Ferguson (barrister) (1935–2009), barrister and politician from Northern Ireland
Richard Saul Ferguson (1837–1900), English antiquary
Dick Ferguson (1950–2010), American racing driver
Rich Ferguson (magician) (born 1970), American magician, entertainer, inventor and creative consultant
Rich Ferguson (athlete) (1931–1986), Canadian athlete
R. Brian Ferguson (born 1951), American anthropologist

See also
Richard Ferguson-Hull, American animation director